Tony Evans (born 14 June 1969) is a former Australian rules footballer who played with West Coast in the AFL during the 1990s. He was named on the forwardline on West Coast's 'Team of the Decade'. While statistically he had an unremarkable career, he is remembered for his brilliant performances in the club's first two premierships in 1992 and 1994, where he collected 20 disposals and three goals, and 17 disposals and three goals respectively.

Statistics

|-
|- style="background-color: #EAEAEA"
! scope="row" style="text-align:center" | 1991
|style="text-align:center;"|
| 40 || 2 || 1 || 5 || 15 || 6 || 21 || 5 || 1 || 0.5 || 2.5 || 7.5 || 3.0 || 10.5 || 2.5 || 0.5 || 0
|-
|style="text-align:center;background:#afe6ba;"|1992†
|style="text-align:center;"|
| 18 || 16 || 18 || 8 || 156 || 105 || 261 || 43 || 41 || 1.1 || 0.5 || 9.8 || 6.6 || 16.3 || 2.7 || 2.6 || 5
|- style="background-color: #EAEAEA"
! scope="row" style="text-align:center" | 1993
|style="text-align:center;"|
| 18 || 19 || 16 || 5 || 175 || 112 || 287 || 59 || 53 || 0.8 || 0.3 || 9.2 || 5.9 || 15.1 || 3.1 || 2.8 || 0
|-
|style="text-align:center;background:#afe6ba;"|1994†
|style="text-align:center;"|
| 18 || 14 || 12 || 7 || 100 || 74 || 174 || 31 || 23 || 0.9 || 0.5 || 7.1 || 5.3 || 12.4 || 2.2 || 1.6 || 0
|- style="background-color: #EAEAEA"
! scope="row" style="text-align:center" | 1995
|style="text-align:center;"|
| 18 || 16 || 7 || 9 || 133 || 94 || 227 || 41 || 35 || 0.4 || 0.6 || 8.3 || 5.9 || 14.2 || 2.6 || 2.2 || 0
|-
! scope="row" style="text-align:center" | 1996
|style="text-align:center;"|
| 18 || 22 || 17 || 11 || 212 || 152 || 364 || 67 || 52 || 0.8 || 0.5 || 9.6 || 6.9 || 16.5 || 3.0 || 2.4 || 3
|- style="background-color: #EAEAEA"
! scope="row" style="text-align:center" | 1997
|style="text-align:center;"|
| 18 || 14 || 7 || 5 || 125 || 66 || 191 || 33 || 29 || 0.5 || 0.4 || 8.9 || 4.7 || 13.6 || 2.4 || 2.1 || 0
|-
! scope="row" style="text-align:center" | 1998
|style="text-align:center;"|
| 18 || 5 || 0 || 0 || 23 || 31 || 54 || 6 || 5 || 0.0 || 0.0 || 4.6 || 6.2 || 10.8 || 1.2 || 1.0 || 0
|- class="sortbottom"
! colspan=3| Career
! 108
! 78
! 50
! 939
! 640
! 1579
! 285
! 239
! 0.7
! 0.5
! 8.7
! 5.9
! 14.6
! 2.6
! 2.2
! 8
|}

References

External links

1969 births
Living people
Australian rules footballers from Western Australia
West Coast Eagles players
West Coast Eagles Premiership players
Claremont Football Club players
Western Australian State of Origin players
People educated at Christ Church Grammar School
Two-time VFL/AFL Premiership players